Baissogryllidae is an extinct family of crickets in the order Orthoptera. There are about 20 genera and 30 described species in Baissogryllidae.

Genera
The genera of Baissogryllidae are divided into five subfamilies:

Subfamily Baissogryllinae 
Baissogryllus 
Castillogryllus 
Eubaissogryllus 
Ponomarenkoana 
Sinagryllus 
Speculogryllus 
Storozhenkoana 
Subfamily Bontzaganiinae 
Anglogryllus 
Bontzagania 
Subfamily Cearagryllinae 
Allocearagryllus 
Cearagrylloides 
Cearagryllus 
Cryptocearagryllus 
Notocearagryllus 
Paracearagryllus 
Santanagryllus 
Subfamily Olindagryllinae 
Olindagryllus 
Subfamily Sharategiinae 
Caririgryllus 
Mongologryllus 
Neosharategia 
Sharategia

References

Crickets